Samuel George Andrews (October 16, 1796June 11, 1863) was an American businessman and politician who served one term as and a U.S. Representative from New York from 1857 to 1859.

Early life and education 
Samuel G. Andrews was born in Derby, Connecticut on October 16, 1796. As a youth, he attended the public schools and a classical academy in Chester, Connecticut. He moved to  New York in 1815 with his parents, who settled in  Rochester. Andrew’s the became engaged in the mercantile business.

Career
His political career began as clerk of the State assembly in 1831 and 1832, then as clerk of Monroe County from 1834 to 1837. He was later a member of the board of aldermen in 1838, then secretary of the State senate in 1840 and 1841. He was also clerk of the court of errors for two years and was appointed postmaster of Rochester on January 8, 1842. He served in that role until his successor was appointed in 1845.

Andrews served twice as mayor of Rochester in 1840 and 1856. He was a New York delegate to the 1856 Republican National Convention.

Congress 
Elected as a Whig (later the Republican Party) to the 35th United States Congress from New York's 29th congressional district, Andrews held office from March 4, 1857, to March 3, 1859.

Death
Andrews died in Rochester on June 11, 1863 at age 66.  He is interred in Mount Hope Cemetery in Rochester.

References

External links
 

1796 births
1863 deaths
19th-century American politicians
New York (state) Republicans
New York (state) Whigs
Burials at Mount Hope Cemetery (Rochester)
Mayors of Rochester, New York
Members of the United States House of Representatives from New York (state)